Veia is a genus of moths of the family Noctuidae. The genus was erected by Francis Walker in 1863.

Species
Veia caeruleotincta (Rothschild, 1915) New Guinea
Veia contracta (Walker, 1865) Aru
Veia homopteroides Walker, [1863] Borneo
Veia microsticta (Turner, 1908) Queensland
Veia pectinata Holloway, 1979 New Caledonia

References

Calpinae
Moth genera